Kabansky (masculine), Kabanskaya (feminine), or Kabanskoye (neuter) may refer to:
Kabansky District, a district of the Buryat Republic, Russia
Kabansky (rural locality) (Kabanskaya, Kabanskoye), name of several rural localities in Russia